Steenhuis is a surname. Notable people with the surname include:

 Guusje Steenhuis (born 1992), Dutch judoka
 Jelmer Steenhuis (born 1954), Dutch creator of puzzles and games
 Mark Steenhuis (born 1980), Canadian professional lacrosse player
 Wout Steenhuis (1923–1985), Dutch multi-instrumentalist

Dutch-language surnames